The 1949–50 Macedonian Republic League was the sixth since its establishment. Rabotnik Bitola won their first championship title.

Participating teams

Final table

References 
Karovski, Ilija (1996) FK Tikvesh 1930–1995 p. 32, 33, 34

External links
SportSport.ba
Football Federation of Macedonia 

Macedonian Football League seasons
Yugo
3